Mark Crisson (born 1949) was born Phillip Mark Stevens Crisson in Boston, Massachusetts in March 1949.  He received his undergraduate degree in Applied Science from the United States Naval Academy, and a Masters of Business Administration from Pacific Lutheran University.  He is currently the CEO of the American Public Power Association—the service organization for the more than 2,000 U.S. community-owned electric utilities that serve more than 46 million Americans.

After resigning his Navy commission in 1975, he first joined Tacoma Public Utilities in Tacoma, Washington as part of its Power Management group, and stayed eight years before leaving in 1983 to become power manager for Martin Marietta when it owned an aluminum company. In 1985 he was appointed to head Direct Service Industries, a trade association of aluminum companies in the Northwest that received power directly from the Bonneville Power Administration.  Crisson returned to Tacoma Public Utilities in 1993 as the CEO/Director of Utilities—a position he held until 2007. While with Tacoma Public Utilities, Crisson served six years as an American Public Power Association elected Board member and four years as an officer.  In 2003, Crisson chaired the APPA Board of Directors and—in 2005—received the association’s Alex Radin Distinguished Service Award for exceptional dedication and leadership in public power. During Crisson’s tenure on the Board, APPA developed a wide range of initiatives that served public power well during the 2001-2002 western energy crisis and subsequent development of federal wholesale power supply policy.  He was named president and CEO of APPA in January 2008.

Crisson is recognized nationally and internationally for his expertise and leadership on power issues.  He was appointed to the Energy Northwest Board of Directors in September 1991.  He is a previous member of the Electricity Advisory Board to the U.S. Secretary of Energy and a past Chair of the Large Public Power Council, as well as of the Pacific Northwest Utilities Conference Committee.  He was previously a member of the board for Tacoma-Pierce County Chamber of Commerce and the Tacoma-Pierce County Economic Development Council.  He has been featured—on behalf of APPA—in CNN’s Situation Room and on Fox Business News, as well as quoted in top-tier trade and national publications.

Crisson previously served on the Board of Directors for United Way of Pierce County, chairing the Board of Directors from 2002–2003 and serving as the Campaign Chair in 1999.

Awards 
 American Power Association's Alex Radin Distinguished Service Award (2005)
 American Public Power Association Life Member Award (2003)
 Tacoma Municipal League Distinguished Citizen Award (2002)
 Business Leader of the Year (awarded by the University of Washington Tacoma and the Pierce County Business Examiner) (2002)

References

1949 births
Living people
People from Boston
Pacific Lutheran University alumni
Martin Marietta people